Mariekerke is the name of several locations:

 Mariekerke, Belgium, near Bornem in the province of Antwerp.
 Mariekerke, Netherlands, a former municipality in the province of Zeeland
 Klein Mariekerke, a hamlet in Zeeland, formerly in the municipality of Mariekerke.